Jens Peder Bergensten (born 18 May 1979), also known as Jeb or Jeb_, is a Swedish video game programmer and designer. He is best known as the lead designer of Minecraft. In 2013, he, along with Minecraft creator Markus Persson, was named as one of Time 100 most influential people in the world. As an employee of Mojang Studios, he had been co-developing Minecraft with Persson since 2010, became the lead designer in 2011, and assumed full control in 2014, when Persson left the company after its acquisition.

Personal life 
Jens Peder Bergensten was born on 18 May 1979 in Örebro, Sweden.

On 11 May 2013, Bergensten married photographer Jenny Bergensten ( Thornell). On 10 December 2015, Bergensten had a son, Björn.

Career 
Bergensten started programming his first games at 11 years old, using BASIC and Turbo Pascal. By age 21, he was a mapper and modder for the first-person shooter game Quake III Arena. He worked as a C++ and Java programmer for the game developer Korkeken Interactive Studio, which went bankrupt and became Oblivion Entertainment. After the insolvency of Oblivion Entertainment, Bergensten moved to Malmö and earned a master's degree in computer science at Lund University in 2008.

Early standalone projects 
During his time working at Korkeken, Bergensten led the development for the online role-playing game Whispers in Akarra, which entertained a small playerbase of several hundred players. He later discontinued this project after straying from the team's original creative vision for the project. Bergensten publicly released the world editors and source code for Akarra'''s server client in 2008. 

Afterwards he founded the indie game development company Oxeye Game Studio with Daniel Brynolf and Pontus Hammarber, who wanted to create a spiritual successor to Whispers in Akarra. The studio's first project was Dawn of Daria, a self-described "massively-multiplayer fantasy life simulator". After several public alpha tests, the project was discontinued like its predecessor, and Oxeye Games Studio switched their focus to various game jam project and tech demos. The company was soon recognized known for the real-time strategy game Harvest: Massive Encounter and later the platform games Cobalt and Cobalt WASD.

Until 24 November 2010, Bergensten worked for the online knowledge community; Planeto.

 Mojang Studios 
In November 2010, Bergensten was hired as Mojang's back-end developer for Scrolls (now known as Caller's Bane). He later began programming increasingly significant parts of Minecraft until he became its lead designer in December 2011, taking over from Markus Persson. Bergensten was part of the team that developed Catacomb Snatch as part of Humble Bundle Mojam, a game jam. In recent years Bergensten has been featured in the teaser videos for Minecraft Live along with Agnes Larsson.

 Games developed 
 Harvest: Massive Encounter (2008)
 Minecraft (2011)
 Caller's Bane (2014)
 Cobalt (2016)
 Cobalt WASD'' (2017)

Awards and nominations

References

External links 

 

1979 births
Indie video game developers
Living people
Lund University alumni
People from Örebro
Swedish computer programmers
Video game designers
Mojang Studios